Małgorzata Chojnacka (born 20 September 1947) is a Polish gymnast. She competed in six events at the 1968 Summer Olympics.

References

1947 births
Living people
Polish female artistic gymnasts
Olympic gymnasts of Poland
Gymnasts at the 1968 Summer Olympics
20th-century Polish women